The Chloroplast Envelope Anion Channel-forming Tic110 (Tic110) Family (TC#1.A.18) consists of proteins of the inner chloroplast envelope membrane. This family consists of the inner membrane protein import apparatus, and appears to be a protein import-related anion-selective channel. It has also been designated (1) IEP110, (2) IAP100 and (3) protein import-related anion channel (PIRAC).

Location 
Most of the Tic110 protein is probably in the intermembrane space. Transport across the outer and inner membranes probably occurs by two independent processes.

Structure 
Arabidopsis thaliana Tic 110 is 996 amino acyl residues long and exhibits 2 putative transmembrane segments (TMSs) near its N-terminus at positions 74-92 and 101-120. Biochemical analyses suggest that this protein is part of a 600 kDa complex. Tic110 has two proposed functions with naturally exclusive structures; a protein-conducting channel with 6 TMSs, and a scaffold with 2 N-terminal TMSs followed by a large soluble domain for binding transit peptides and other stromal translocon components. The C-terminal half of Tic110 possesses a rod-shaped helix-repeat structure that is too flattened and elongated to be a channel. The structure is most similar to the HEAT-repeat motif that functions as scaffolds for protein-protein interactions. The pore size was estimated to be about 6.5 Å.

Transport Reaction 
The transport reactions across the chloroplast inner membrane catalyzed by Tic110 are:
 (1) anions (out) ⇌ anions (in)
 (2) proteins (out) → proteins (in)

References 

Protein families
Membrane proteins
Transmembrane proteins
Transmembrane transporters
Transport proteins
Integral membrane proteins